Femizon is the name of two fictional groups appearing in American comic books published by Marvel Comics.

Fictional team history

Earth-712 Femizons

The first group to be called Femizons were the women of Femizonia, a gynarchic future world in an alternate timeline where women had become Amazon-like warriors, ruling over male slaves. It was this world that produced Thundra, a recurring enemy, and later ally, of The Thing.

Earth-616 Femizons

The second group to be called Femizons was a group of all-female supervillains in the Marvel Comics universe. They were enemies mainly for Captain America, and their goal was to conquer Earth and create a utopia where women ruled. Led by Superia, who claimed to be inspired by stories of Thundra's Femizons, the group consisted of a large number of established female criminals and super villainesses. Superia gained Blackbird, Iron Maiden, MODAM, Moonstone, and Nightshade as her lieutenants.

Members

Earth-712 version
 Princess Lyra - 
 Syrani - 
 Thundra -

Earth-616 version

In the group shot, there are two unidentified members of the Femizons who are briefly shown.

References

External links
 Femizons (Earth-616 version) at Marvel Wiki
 The original Femizons at Appendix to the Marvel Universe
 Superia's Femizons at Appendix to the Marvel Universe

Marvel Comics supervillain teams
Characters created by Stan Lee
Characters created by John Romita Sr.
Characters created by Mark Gruenwald
Marvel Comics female supervillains